The National Movement of the Revolution (abbreviated MNR) was a political party in the Republic of the Congo. MNR was founded at a congress held June 29 to July 6, 1964. MNR was instituted as the sole legal political party in the country on July 20, 1964, according to the Law No. 25-65. Pre-existing political parties were ordered to fuse into the MNR. MNR adopted scientific socialism as its ideological foundation. Ambroise Noumazalaye was the First Secretary of the party.

MNR was a mass party. It had two central leading organs, a Central Committee and a Political Bureau. The Political Bureau executed the decisions of the Central Committee. It also gave the President approval regarding the appointment of ministers in the government of the Republic. The leftwing faction of party was based in the northern areas of the country. MNR published the journal Etumba.

In August 1964, a founding congress of the Youth of the National Movement of the Revolution (JMNR) was held. JMNR soon went beyond the control of the party, and on June 20, 1965 a new paramilitary structure National Civilian Defense Corps (Defense civile) was formed. The Defense civile was put under the direct control of the MNR.

In the summer of 1966 MNR moved to politicize the armed forces. A law was passed on June 22, 1966, which transformed the Congolese Armed Forces into the National People's Army (APN).  A High Command of the APN was formed jointly by the government and the MNR.  The High Command was led by a political commission, consisting of civilians and led by an officer party member. The lieutenant Marien Ngouabi, later the president of the country, became the APN representative in the MNR Central Committee.

In the same year 1966 a political dispute erupted between the President Alphonse Massamba-Débat and the leftwing of the MNR. As a result, in the summer of 1967 a Permanent Commission of the MNR was formed. The task of the Permanent Commission was to control the day-to-day work of the government.

In December 1969 MNR was substituted by a new party, the Congolese Party of Labour (PCT). PCT based itself on the MNR charter from 1966, but unlike MNR, PCT was a vanguard party.

Electoral history

Presidential elections

National Assembly elections

See also 
Cold War in the Third World
People's Republic of the Congo

References

Defunct political parties in the Republic of the Congo
Political parties established in 1964
Political parties disestablished in 1969
Communism in the Republic of the Congo
1964 establishments in the Republic of the Congo
1969 disestablishments in the Republic of the Congo
Parties of one-party systems